Stigmella spinosissimae is a moth of the family Nepticulidae. It is found in Great Britain and Ireland. It is also present in the eastern part of the Palearctic realm.

The larvae feed on Rosa pimpinellifolia and possibly other Rosa species. They mine the leaves of their host plant. The mine consists of an early gallery, which is relatively straight. The frass is concentrated in a linear line, leaving clear narrow margins and not ending in a blotch.

References

Nepticulidae
Moths described in 1928
Moths of Europe
Moths of Asia